This glossary of civil engineering terms is a list of definitions of terms and concepts pertaining specifically to civil engineering, its sub-disciplines, and related fields. For a more general overview of concepts within engineering as a whole, see Glossary of engineering.

A

B

C

D

E

F

G

H

I

J

K

L

M

N

O

P

R

S

T

U

V

W

X

Y

Z

See also 
Glossary of engineering
Glossary of mechanical engineering
Glossary of structural engineering
Glossary of prestressed concrete terms
Glossary of architecture
Glossary of physics
National Council of Examiners for Engineering and Surveying
Fundamentals of Engineering Examination
Principles and Practice of Engineering Examination
Graduate Aptitude Test in Engineering

References 

civil engineering
Civil engineering
Civil engineering
Wikipedia glossaries using description lists